EERA is a four letter abbreviation that can stand for a number of things:

 East of England Regional Assembly, the regional assembly for the East of England region of the United Kingdom.
 European Educational Research Association, an association of national educational research associations in Europe.
 European Energy Research Alliance, sponsored by the European Commission and formed in 2008
 Electrical Equipment Representatives Association
 European Electronics Recyclers Association, represents the interest of the WEEE recycling companies in Europe.
 Eastern Educational Research Association
 Rapla Airfield (ICAO airport code)